Rubus perspicuus is a rare North American species of flowering plant in the rose family. It has been found only in Michigan and Wisconsin in the north-central United States.

The genetics of Rubus is extremely complex, so that it is difficult to decide on which groups should be recognized as species. There are many rare species with limited ranges such as this. Further study is suggested to clarify the taxonomy. Some studies have suggested that R. perspicuus may have originated as a hybrid between R. allegheniensis and R. setosus.

References

perspicuus
Plants described in 1906
Flora of Michigan
Flora of Wisconsin
Flora without expected TNC conservation status